Axel Reinhold Ståhle (1 February 1891 – 21 November 1987) was a Swedish Army officer and horse rider who competed in the 1924 Summer Olympics. He and his horse Cecil finished seventh in the individual jumping event and won a gold medal with the Swedish jumping team.

Ståhle became ryttmästare in the reserve in 1928.

Awards and decorations
  Knight of the Order of the Sword (1941)

References

1891 births
1987 deaths
Swedish Army officers
Swedish male equestrians
Swedish show jumping riders
Olympic equestrians of Sweden
Equestrians at the 1924 Summer Olympics
Olympic gold medalists for Sweden
Olympic medalists in equestrian
People from Helsingborg
Medalists at the 1924 Summer Olympics
Knights of the Order of the Sword